Matt Nance (born November 4, 1996) is a former American soccer player who last played for Tacoma Defiance in the USL Championship.

Career
Nance played four years of college soccer at Xavier University between 2014 and 2018. While at college, Nance also appeared for USL PDL side Cincinnati Dutch Lions in 2017.

On March 4, 2019, Nance signed for USL Championship side Tacoma Defiance.

Personal Life
Nance married former Xavier Women's Soccer player, Kenadie Carlson, in October 2021.

References

External links
Xavier Muskateers bio
Seattle Sounders bio

1996 births
Living people
American soccer players
Xavier Musketeers men's soccer players
Cincinnati Dutch Lions players
Tacoma Defiance players
Association football defenders
Soccer players from Michigan
People from Macomb County, Michigan
Sportspeople from Metro Detroit
USL League Two players
USL Championship players